Marios Giourdas (sometimes written as Gkiourdas) (Greek: Μάριος Γκιούρδας; born 2 March 1973) is a Greek male former volleyball player. He was part of the Greece men's national volleyball team. He competed with the national team at the 2004 Summer Olympics in Athens, Greece. At club level, he played most notably for Olympiacos, Parma and Iraklis. Giourdas is also a firefighter in Athens. In 2016, at a fire near Pireaus, he, along with other firefighters, saved nine people and a baby.

Clubs
  Ethnikos Alexandroupolis (1987-1989)
  GE Alexandroupolis (1989-1991)
  Ethnikos Alexandroupolis  (1991-1995)
  Olympiacos Piraeus (1995-2003)
  Unimade Parma (2003-2004)
  Iraklis Thessaloniki (2004-2006)
  Olympiacos Piraeus (2006-2007)
  EA Patras (2007-2009)
  Ethnikos Alexandroupolis (2009-2010)
  AONS Milon (2010-2013)

See also
 Greece at the 2004 Summer Olympics

References

External links
 profile, club career, info at greekvolley.gr (in Greek)
 

1973 births
Living people
Greek men's volleyball players
Volleyball players at the 2004 Summer Olympics
Olympic volleyball players of Greece
Olympiacos S.C. players
Iraklis V.C. players
E.A. Patras players
Sportspeople from Alexandroupolis